Harold Kalina (July 2, 1928 – August 15, 2016) was an American lawyer, judge, and politician.

Born in Minneapolis, Minnesota, Kalina went to the Minneapolis public schools. He served in the United States Army. Kalina graduated from University of Minnesota in 1949 and received his law degree from University of Minnesota Law School in 1953. He practiced law in Minneapolis. From 1955 to 1972, Kalina served in the Minnesota State Senate. He then served as a Minnesota District Court judge from 1972 to 1983 and from 1990 to 1995. Kalina died in Minneapolis, Minnesota.

Notes

1928 births
2016 deaths
Politicians from Minneapolis
University of Minnesota alumni
University of Minnesota Law School alumni
Military personnel from Minnesota
Minnesota lawyers
Minnesota state court judges
Minnesota state senators
20th-century American judges
20th-century American lawyers